Bassett is a city in Allen County, Kansas, United States.  It is situated along the Neosho River.  As of the 2020 census, the population of the city was 20.

History
Bassett was founded in 1903.  The following year the Bassett and Concreto extensions were made to the Iola Electric Railroad street car line.  In 1914, the first concrete road in Kansas was laid in Bassett.

Geography
Bassett is located at  (37.904017, -95.408005).  The city is situated east of the Neosho River along the south bank of Elm Creek in Iola Township, and it lies adjacent to the southern border of the city of Iola (the county seat).  Lake Bassola lies to the east of the city. The city is less than two miles southwest of the interchange between U.S. Routes 54 and 169.

Climate
The climate in this area is characterized by hot, humid summers and generally mild to cool winters.  According to the Köppen Climate Classification system, Bassett has a humid subtropical climate, abbreviated "Cfa" on climate maps.

Demographics

2010 census
As of the census of 2010, there were 14 people, 5 households, and 4 families residing in the city. The racial makeup of the city was 100.0% White.

There were 5 households, of which 40.0% had children under the age of 18 living with them, 80.0% were married couples living together, and 20.0% were non-families. 0.0% of all households were made up of individuals. The average household size was 2.80 and the average family size was 3.00.

The median age in the city was 38 years. 28.6% of residents were under the age of 18; 7.1% were between the ages of 18 and 24; 35.7% were from 25 to 44; 28.5% were from 45 to 64; and 0.0% were 65 years of age or older. The gender makeup of the city was 64.3% male and 35.7% female.

2000 census
As of the U.S. Census in 2000, there were 22 people, 10 households, and 7 families residing in the city. The racial makeup of the city was 95.45% White and 4.55% Black or African American.

There were 10 households, out of which 30.0% had children under the age of 18 living with them, 50.0% were married couples living together, 10.0% had a female householder with no husband present, and 30.0% were non-families. 20.0% of all households were made up of individuals, and none had someone living alone who was 65 years of age or older. The average household size was 2.20 and the average family size was 2.14.

In the city, the population was spread out, with 13.6% under the age of 18, 22.7% from 18 to 24, 22.7% from 25 to 44, 31.8% from 45 to 64, and 9.1% who were 65 years of age or older. The median age was 34 years. For every 100 females, there were 120.0 males. For every 100 females age 18 and over, there were 137.5 males.

The median income for a household in the city was $14,688, and the median income for a family was $14,375. Males had a median income of $16,250 versus $0 for females. The per capita income for the city was $12,388. None of the population and none of the families were below the poverty line.

Government
Bassett is incorporated as a city of the third class and, as such, receives services from Iola Township and Allen County.

See also
 Great Flood of 1951

References

Further reading

External links
 Bassett - Directory of Public Officials
 USD 257, local school district
 Bassett city map, KDOT

Cities in Allen County, Kansas
Cities in Kansas
Populated places established in 1903
1903 establishments in Kansas